The epithet the Short applies to the following:

Dionysius Exiguus, a monk, inventor of the Anno Domini era
Otto VI, Margrave of Brandenburg-Salzwedel (1303), member of the House of Ascania and co-ruler of Brandenburg
Pepin the Short (768), first King of the Franks, son of Charles Martel
Władysław I Łokietek (1261 – 1333), King of Poland, also called "the Elbow-high"

See also
List of people known as the Tall

Lists of people by epithet